is a railway station in Aira, Kagoshima, Japan. It is operated by of JR Kyushu and is on the Nippō Main Line.

Lines

Layout 
The station consists of a side platform serving a single track on a low embankment in a fairly confined area. There is no station building. At the base of the embankment, a shed has been set up which houses a staffed ticket window. To one side of this, there is a sheltered waiting area with some seats. On the other side of the ticket window are automatic ticket vending machines and a SUGOCA card reading and a short flight of steps leading up to the platform. The platform is generally very narrow. At one point where the platform is wider, some seats and a SUGOCA charge machine are provided. Bike sheds are provided at the station forecourt.

Management of the passenger facilities at the station has been outsourced to the JR Kyushu Tetsudou Eigyou Co., a wholly owned subsidiary of JR Kyushu specialising in station services. It staffs the ticket booth which is equipped with a POS machine but does not have a Midori no Madoguchi facility.

Platforms

JR

Adjacent stations

History
The station was opened on 13 March 1988 by JR Kyushu as an additional station on the existing track of the Nippō Main Line.

Passenger statistics
In fiscal 2016, the station was used by an average of 969 passengers daily (boarding passengers only), and it ranked 171st among the busiest stations of JR Kyushu.

Nearby places
Shigetomi Junior High School
Hiramatsu Post office

See also
 List of railway stations in Japan

References

External links

Aira (JR Kyushu)

Railway stations in Japan opened in 1988
Railway stations in Kagoshima Prefecture